Open water swimming, for the 2013 Bolivarian Games, took place on 21 November and 23 November 2013. This sport was contested at the port town of Salaverry.

During the 5 km race four swimmers and seven in the 10 km race, suffered hypothermia and could not finish the competition, being taken to the local hospital by the National Police of Peru.

Medal table

Medalists

References

Events at the 2013 Bolivarian Games
2013 in swimming
Open water swimming competitions
2013 Bolivarian Games